William Pitt Wentworth (1839–1896), often abbreviated as W.P. Wentworth or William P. Wentworth, was a Vermont-based architect who worked in Boston, but did institutional and ecclesiastic commissions in other areas.

Works by Wentworth that both survive and are listed on the U.S. National Register of Historic Places include:
Church of Saint Lawrence, (1889), Fuller St., jct. with Sisson St., Alexandria Bay, NY (Wentworth, William P.)
Medfield State Hospital, 45 Hospital Rd., Medfield, MA (Wentworth, William P.)
People's Unitarian Church, 1640 N St., Ord, Nebraska (Wentworth, William)
Trinity Episcopal Church and Parish House, 227 Sherman St., Watertown, NY, (Wentworth, W.P.)
St. George's Episcopal Church (Leadville, Colorado), 200 W. 4th St., Leadville, CO, (Wentworth, W.P.)
St. Luke's Episcopal Church (Jamestown, NY), 410 N, Main ST Jamestown, NY, Wentworth, W.P.)

Wentworth may be confused with Charles F. Wentworth who was the architect who worked with Ralph Adams Cram.

References

External links
Photo of hospital building in Burlington, Vermont

American architects